Harpaglossus is a genus of beetles in the family Carabidae, containing the following species:

 Harpaglossus laevigatus (Dejean, 1828)
 Harpaglossus obscurus Chaudoir, 1856
 Harpaglossus opacus (Chaudoir, 1856)
 Harpaglossus politus (Chaudoir, 1856)

References

Licininae